Arthur Salz (31 December 1881, Stod – 10 August 1963, Worthington) was a German professor of sociology and economics who wrote on mercantilism, imperialism, and power. He taught at the University of Heidelberg before being forced to flee Germany because of his Jewish faith. He was familiar with the Stefan George circle and married Sophie Kantorowiz, the sister of historian Ernst Kantorowicz.

Life 
Salz was born on 31 December 1881, in Staab, Bohemia (today Stod in the Czech Republic) to Heinrich Salz and Rosa née Popper. After completing gymnasium in Plzeň, Salz studied economics in Berlin, where he attended the lectures of Georg Simmel. He later studied in Munich and Heidelberg, where he befriended Friedrich Gundolf and came in contact with the Stefan George circle. He remained in contact with Stefan George until 1925. He was also a regular guest in the home of Max Weber. Salz completed his dissertation in 1903 under Lujo Brentano, earning a doctorate in political science (Doctor Rerum Politicarum). Salz ran his family's business in Staab for a short time thereafter.

Salz was the co-editor of Heidelberger Studien aus dem Institut für Sozial- und Staatswissenschaft and lectured at the Handelshochschule in Mannheim and at the Akademie der Arbeit in Frankfurt. In 1907, Salz took on a position as a lecturer at the University of Heidelberg. After further studies in Vienna and Prague, Salz completed his post-doctoral work (habilitation) in 1909, entitled "Wallenstein als Merkantilist" ("Wallenstein as a Mercantilist"). He became an assistant professor at the University of Heidelberg in 1916.

In 1912, Salz married Sophie Kantorowicz, the sister of historian Ernst Kantorowicz. They had three children, Beate, Judith, and Henry.

Salz served in the Austro-Hungarian army during World War I. He held a post as an economic adviser to Djemal Pascha, an assignment which took him to Constantinople and Damascus and awakened Salz's interest in Islam although he himself was a religious Jew.

During the Nazi regime in Germany, Salz, as a Jew, was forced in 1933 to leave his position at the University of Heidelberg. He lived in England for one year,  as a guest professor at the University of Cambridge. In 1934, he emigrated to the USA and became a professor at Ohio State University. He never returned to Germany.

Publications (selected) 
 Beiträge zur Geschichte und Kritik der Lohnfondstheorie, Stuttgart: Cotta, 1905.
 Geschichte der böhmischen Industrie in der Neuzeit, München: Duncker & Humblot, 1913.
 Für die Wissenschaft gegen die Gebildeten unter ihren Verächtern, München: Drei Masken Verlag, 1921.
 Macht und Wirtschaftsgesetz, Leipzig: B. G. Teubner, 1930.
 Das Wesen des Imperialismus, Leipzig: Teubner, 1931.
 Wallenstein als Merkantilist, in: Mitteilungen des Vereins für Geschichte der Deutschen in Böhmen 47, 4 (1909), 433-461.
 (1944). The Present Position of Economics. American Economic Review 34(1), 15-24.
 (1948). The Metamorphosis of Power. Synopsis: Festgabe für Alfred Weber, 459-476.
 (1959). A Note from a Student of Simmel’s. In Kurt Wolff (Ed.) Georg Simmel 1858-1918. 233-236.

Literature 
 Wittebur, Klemens. Die Deutsche Soziologie im Exil. 1933 - 1945, Münster; Hamburg: Lit., 1991 (Dissertationsschrift von 1989). Starting at page 71.
 Schönhärl, Korinna. (2009). Wissen und Visionen. Theorie und Politik der Ökonomen im Stefan George-Kreis. Berlin.
 Fried, Johannes. Zwischem "Geheimem Deutschland" und "geheimer Akademie der Arbeit". Der Wirtschaftswissenschaftler Arthur Salz. In: Barbara Schlieben (Ed.), Geschichtsbilder im George-Kreis: Wege zur Wissenschaft. Göttingen: 2004. 249-302.
 Strauss, H. A., Röder, W., Rosenblatt, B., and Caplan, H. (1983). "Salz, Arthur." International Biographical Dictionary of Central European émigrés 1933-1945. Vol. 2. p. 1015.

References

External links 
 
 
 Arthur Salz Collection (Leo Baeck Institute) Arthur Salz Collection at the Leo Baeck Institute (New York, NY)
 The LBI Archives hold correspondence from Arthur Salz as part of Der Neue Merkur Collection, 1919-1925.
 The International Institute of Social History, located in Amsterdam, holds correspondence between Arthur Salz and Gottfried Salomon-Delatour as part of the Gottfried Salomon-Delatour Papers.

German sociologists
German economists
Jewish emigrants from Nazi Germany to the United States
Ohio State University people
1881 births
1963 deaths
German Bohemian people
German male non-fiction writers
People from Stod
Austro-Hungarian military personnel of World War I